Helen Weston (born Cwmbran) is a Welsh international netball player.

Early career
Weston began her career with the Cwmbran Netball Club.

International honours
She made her international debut at seventeen and has been captain of the side for many years, becoming the second most capped player in international netball and playing as a goalkeeper. As of June 2007 she is the record holder for the most Wales caps (112).

Welsh Sports Hall of Fame
In June 2007 she was inducted into the Welsh Sports Hall of Fame. She is currently the only netball player in the Welsh Sports Hall of Fame.

References

Living people
Welsh netball players
Sportspeople from Cwmbran
Year of birth missing (living people)